City as an Artist's Subjectivity (. 2020) is a publication in the format of an artist's book, spearheaded in St. Petersburg by the artist-curator Alexey Parygin. Thirty-five modern artists from four Russian cities took part in the project (Saint Petersburg, Moscow, Nizhny Novgorod, Kazan).

History of creation
Every invited artist created only one graphic composition accompanied by the author's commentary, a short text with their understanding of a large modern city. All graphic sheets are collected in specially designed publishing boxes. The limited edition of the portfolio included 58 numbered copies, signed by the authors of the compositions, the curator and the publisher.

All graphic sheets are made in color, in various printed graphic techniques: lithography, linocut, woodcut, plywood engraving, serigraphy, stencil, etching, manual typesetting, manual photo printing and others.
So each sheet of this edition is different from one another: tinting with a brush and spray paint, colored pencils, watercolor or acrylic. All graphic sheets are created on paper of different type and tone, specially selected for each author, which was the project's program setting.

The curator invited artists with an established creative style to participate in this publication. All of them belong to different generations and schools and have different, sometimes diametrically opposed views on the tasks and value criteria of art.

Thirty-five project artists: Vladimir Kachalsky, Valery Mishin, Alexandr Borkov, Valery Korchagin, Viktor Remishevsky, Alexey Parygin, Viktor Lukin, Marina Spivak, Mikhail Pogarsky, Igor Ivanov, Grigory Katsnelson, Leonid Tishkov, Andrey Korolchuk, Gafur Mendagaliev, Kira Matissen, Petr Perevezentsev, Ella Tsyplyakova, Yan Antonyshev, Mikhail Molochnikov, Dmitry Kawarga, Igor Baskin, Boris Zabirokhin, Evgeny Strelkov, Anatoly Vasilev, Vasiliy Vlasov, Alexandr Pozin, Vyacheslav Shilov, Nadezhda Anfalova, Ekaterina Posetselskaya, Andrey Chezhin, Igor Ganzenko, Yuri Shtapakov, Alexandr Artamonov, Anastasiya Zykina and Vasya Khorst.

Key ideas

The project logo is a black circle that outlines the sheet; it appears on the title page of the publication, on the cover of the catalog and on posters for exhibitions. It is a minimalistic sign of hermetic completeness and, at the same time, an image of a wheel, of movement.
Urban routine, observed on almost every corner. From the banal to the sacred and back again.
The city within. Triviality, vaguely recognisable uncertainty, an endless variety of interpretations is the City. Subjective, personally experienced understanding of the modern metropolis.

Museum collections and foundations
 Pushkin Museum. Science Library/ Rare Books Dept. (Moscow). — ″Instance No. 8″.
 Russian Museum. Department of engraving XVIII-XXI centuries. (St. Petersburg). — ″Instance No. 18″.
 National Library of Russia. Prints Department. (St. Petersburg). — ″Instance No. 3″.
 AVC Charity Foundation. (Moscow).

Exhibitions
 The City as an Subjectivity / Moscow. — AVC Charity Foundation. Exhibition Center. Moscow. August 24 — October 4, 2021.
 The City as an Subjectivity / St. Petersburg. — Museum of Urban Sculpture in St. Petersburg. New Exhibition Hall. St. Petersburg. October 23, 2020 — February 22, 2021.

Bibliography
 Alexey Parygin A City as an Artist's Subjectivity / Artist’s Book Yearbook 2022-2023. Edited by Sarah Bodman. — Bristol: CFPR (Centre for Fine Print Research). University of the West of England, 2022. — 292 pp. ISBN 978-1-906501-22-8
 Alexey Parygin Reports & Reviws/ A City as the Artist's Subjectivity // Book Arts Newsletter. — No. 140. Bristol: CFPR (Centre for Fine Print Research). University of the West of England, 2021, July — August. — P. 46-48. ISSN 1754-9086
 Klimova Ek. A City as a Book / Artist’s Book Yearbook 2022-2023. Edited by Sarah Bodman. — Bristol: CFPR (Centre for Fine Print Research). University of the West of England. 2022. — 292 pp. 
 Blagodatov N.I. Субъективные пространства города. — Петербургские искусствоведческие тетради, выпуск 67, СПб: АИС, 2021. — С. 66-68. 
 Koshkina O. Yu. Воодушевлённые городом. — Петербургские искусствоведческие тетради, выпуск 67, СПб: АИС, 2021. — С. 69-71. 
 Grigoryants El. «Город» в формате Artist's book. — Петербургские искусствоведческие тетради, выпуск 65, СПб: АИС, 2021. — С. 96-100.
 Alexey Parygin Город как субъективность художника. — Петербургские искусствоведческие тетради, выпуск 64, СПб: АИС, 2021. — С. 77-84. 
 Savitsky S. Климатическая западня: "Город как субъективность" в Музее городской скульптуры // Деловой Петербург. — 2020, 11 декабря.
 City as Artist's subjectivity. Artist's book project. Catalog. Authors of the articles: Parygin A.B., Markov T.A.,  Klimova E.D.,, Borovsky A.D., Severyukhin D.Ya., Grigoryants El., Blagodatov N.I. (Rus & En) — SPb: Ed. T. Markova. 2020. — 128 p. 
 Emme Ek. Художники сыграли в города // Вечерний Санкт-Петербург. — 2020, 6 ноября.
 Биосоциальный "город" (интервью с Денисом Ивановым) // Инфоскоп. — 2020, ноябрь. № 271.
 Самойлова А. Город напечатали вручную // Kommersant-СПб. №196. — 2020, 26 октября. — С. 20.
 В Петербурге создан крупнейший в мире проект в формате книги художника // Argumenty i Fakty-Петербург. — 2020, 20 октября.
 Alekseeva M. Петербуржцам покажут, как выглядит город, глазами десятков художников // Петербургский дневник. — 2020, 20 октября.
 Город как субъективность художника // Линия полета. — 2020, октября.

Interview
 Город — как комикс, город — как настольная игра, город — как биполярное расстройство. We are talking to the curators of the exhibition — the artist Alexey Parygin and the head of the engraving department of the State Russian Museum Ekaterina Klimova. Radio Komsomolskaya Pravda. Broadcast archive. — 2020, October 26. (Rus)

TV Reports
 Российские художники рассказали истории о любви и ненависти к городам. Lana Konokotina. NTV—St. Petersburg. "Today—St. Petersburg". October 23, 2020. 19:30. (Rus)
 Выставка книги художника «Город как субъективность» в Музее городской скульптуры. Vyacheslav Rezakov. Saint Petersburg TV. «Cultural Evolution». October 24, 2020. 11:15. (Rus)
 «Книга художника». В Петербурге представили уникальный альбом с изображениями 35 городов России. Saint Petersburg TV. October 24, 2020. (Rus)
 "Город как субъективность" в Музее городской скульптуры. Igor Tsyzhonov. Channel One Russia—St. Petersburg. «Good morning, St. Petersburg!». January 15, 2021. 10:10. (Rus)
 35 стилей, методов и историй взаимоотношений с городом на Неве. Выставка «Город как субъективность» собрала уникальную Книгу художника. Saint Petersburg TV. «Morning in St. Petersburg». 2020, 26 October. (Rus)

Selected compositions

References

Artists' books
Conceptual art
2020 books